The 1914 South Carolina gubernatorial election was held on November 3, 1914, to select the governor of the state of South Carolina. Richard Irvine Manning III emerged from the crowded Democratic primary to win in the runoff and overwhelmingly won the effectively one-party state's general election to become the 92nd governor of South Carolina.

Democratic primary
The South Carolina Democratic Party held their primary for governor on August 25 and progressive reformer Richard Irvine Manning III emerged as the winner in a crowded field. He garnered the support from the candidates eliminated in the runoff election and was able to score a decisive victory over John Gardiner Richards, Jr., the candidate favored by former governor Coleman Livingston Blease, on September 8.

General election
The general election was held on November 3, 1914, and Richard Irvine Manning III was elected the next governor of South Carolina. Being a non-presidential election and few contested races, turnout was much less than the previous gubernatorial election.

 
 

|-
| 
| colspan=5 |Democratic hold
|-

See also
Governor of South Carolina
List of governors of South Carolina
South Carolina gubernatorial elections

References

"Report of the Secretary of State to the General Assembly of South Carolina.  Part II." Reports and Resolutions of the General Assembly of the State of South Carolina. Volume IV. Columbia, SC: 1915, p. 339.

External links
SCIway Biography of Richard Irvine Manning III

Gubernatorial
1914
South Carolina
November 1914 events